Ogeum station is a railway station on Line 3 and Line 5 of the Seoul Subway. Seoul Metro operates both Line 3 and 5 platforms. It is the southern terminus of Line 3 and travel time between Ogeum Station and Daehwa Station, the northern terminus of the line, is approximately 95 minutes.

Some scenes for the film The Bourne Legacy were filmed at the station.

Station layout

References 

Railway stations opened in 1996
Seoul Metropolitan Subway stations
Metro stations in Songpa District
Seoul Subway Line 3
Seoul Subway Line 5